The Galaxy Award is China's most prestigious science fiction award, which was started in 1986 by the magazines Tree of Wisdom and Science Literature & Art.  After Tree of Wisdom ceased publication soon afterwards, the award was organized solely by Science Literature & Art, which was renamed to Science Fiction World in 1991.

The structure of the prize has evolved over time, becoming an annual prize in 1991 and has recognized different categories over time.

In September 2016, the 27th Galaxy Award was held at the Beijing University of Aeronautics and Astronautics;, in November 2017, the 28th award ceremony was held in Chengdu, China.

Recent Winners
A partial list of winners:

1986

Wu Xiankui, Yongshi-hao Chongxiang Taifeng ["The Hero Tacks Into the Typhoon"] (1985); 
Miao Shi, Bu Yao Wen Wo Cong Nali Lai ["Don't Ask Me Where I'm From"] (1985);
Kong Liang, Daoqie Qingchun de Zei ["The Thief Who Stole Youth"] (1985); 
Yang Zhipeng, Qingchun de Juanlian ["Youthful Nostalgia"] (1985); 
Wei Yahua, Yuanfeng Laike ["Guest From Afar"] (1985).

1988-1989

 Tan Xiaoke, Zai Shijian de Qian Mu Houmian ["Behind the Lead Curtain of Time"] (1988).

1991

 Tan Li, Taikong Xiudaoyuan ["Space Monastery"] (1990).

1992

No first prize.

1993

 Wang Jinkang, Yadang Huigui ["Adam's Regression"] (1992).

1994

 Wang Jinkang, Tian Huo ["Heaven's Fire"] (1993) (Special Prize); 
 He Hongwei, Pingxing ["Parallel"] (1993);
 {XING} He, Chaosheng ["Pilgrimage"] (1993).

1994

 Wang Jinkang, Shengming zhi Ge ["The Song of Life"] (1994) (Special Prize);
 Wu Yan, Cang Sang ["Dark Blue Mulberry"] (1994);
 Han Jianguo, Leisa Poyang Hu ["Tears in Poyang Lake"] (1994).

1996

{XING} He, Juedou zai Wangluo ["Duel on the Internet"] (1995) (Special Prize);
 Wang Jinkang, Xinai Emeng ["Occidental Nightmare"] (1995);
 Su Xuejun, Huoxing Chenbao ["Martian Dust Storm"] (1995).

1997

Lu Yang, Heidong zhi wen ["Kiss of the Black Cave"] (1996) (Special Prize);
 Wang Jinkang, Qizhong Waike ["Seven Outer Casings"] (1996);
 Zhao Haihong, Huashu de Yanjing ["Eyes of the Birches"] (1996).

1998

 Wang Jinkang, Bao ["Leopard"] (Special Prize) (1997);
 Zhou Yukun, Huihe Dishi Xingxing ["Encounter with the Tenth Planet"] (1997);
 Ling Chen, Mao ["Cat"] (1997).

1999

Zhao Haihong, Yi'ekasida ["Jocasta"] (1998) (Special Prize);
 Liu Cixin, Daishang Tade Yanjing ["Her Eyes on the Belt"] (1998);
 He Hongwei, Yi Yu ["Strange Land"] (1998).

2000

 Liu Cixin, Liulang Diqiu ["Vagabond Earth"] (1999) (Special Prize);
 Li Xingchun, Chuchuang Li de Helan Dutu ["The Dutch Gambler in a Glass Case"] (1999);
 He Xi, Ai Bieli ["Love is Over"] (1999).

2001

 
 Liu Cixin, Quan Pingdai Zuse Sai Ganrao ["The Complete Frequency Blocking Fortress"] (2000);
 Wang Jinkang, Titian Hangdao ["The Profession of Day Replacement"] (2000);
 Pan Haitian, Da Jue Kuai Pao ["Klaxon Sounds, Swift Retreat"] (2000);
 Zhao Haihong, Tui ["Exuviation"] (2000);
 Wang Yanan, Daomu ["Grave Robber"] (2000).

2002

 He Hongwei, Liudao Congsheng ["Six Ways to the Multitude"] (2001);
 Liu Cixin, Zhongguo Taiyang ["The Chinese Sun"] (2001);
 Wang Jinkang, Suixing Bozhong ["Seeding Mercury"] (2001);
 Ma Yi, Shake Space (2001);
 Yang Mei, Riguang Zhen ["Pressing Sunlight"] (2001).

2003

 He Hongwei, Shanxinzhe ["The Broken-Hearted"] (2002);
 Liu Cixin, Diqiu Dapao ["Earth's Cannon"] (2002);
 Luo Longxiang, Shisheng de Mo ["The Devil of Biology"] (2002) (Newcomer's Award);
 La La, Chun Ri Ze: Yun Meng Shan: Zhong Kun ["Spring Sun Spring: Yun Meng Mountain: Elder Brothers"] (2002) (Newcomer's Award).

2004

 Liu Cixin, Jingzi ["Mirror"] (2003);
 Xia Jia, Guan Yaojing de Pingzi (April 2004 Kehuan Shijie trans. Linda Rui Feng as "The Demon-Enslaving Flask" November 2012 Renditions);
 Qian Lifang, Tianyi ["Skywish"] (2003).
 (Most Popular Foreign Writer) Lois McMaster Bujold.

2005

 Liu Cixin, Shanyang Renlei ["To Support Mankind"] (2004);
 He Xi, Tiansheng Wocai ["Innate Talent"] (2004);
 Xie Yunning, Shendu Zhuangji ["Deep Impact"] (2004) (Newcomer's Award);
 (Most Popular Foreign Writer) Douglas Adams.

2006

 Liu Cixin, Santi ["The Three Body Problem"] (2005);
 Wang Jinkang, Zhongji Baozha ["Ultimate Explosion"] (2005);
 Chang Jia, Kunlun ["Kunlun Mountains"] (2005);
 (Most Popular Foreign Writer) Robert J. Sawyer.

2007

 La La, Yongbu Xiaoshi de Dianbo ["The Perpetual Electric Wave"] (2006);
 Chang Jia, 674-hao Gonglu ["Highway 674"] (2006);
 Luo Longxiang, Zai Taxiang ["In a Strange Land"] (2006);
 (Most Popular Foreign Writer) Neil Gaiman.

2008

 Chang Jia, Fusang zhi Shang ["Fusang's Wound"] (2007); 
 Xia Jia, Yongxia zhi Meng ["Perpetual Dream"] (venue unknown 2007); 
 Wang Jinkang, Huo Zhuo ["Live Contact"] (2007); 
 (Most Popular Foreign Writer) Neil Gaiman.

2009

 Jiang Bo, Shikong Zhuiji ["Time/Space Pursuit"] (2008); 
 Wang Jinkang, Youguan Shikong Luxing de Malong Dinglu ["Marlon's Law of Space-Time Travelling"] (2008);
 He Xi, Shiyi-nian Hou de Laike ["The Traveller from 1,000,000,000 Years Hence"] (2008);
 (Most Popular Foreign Writer) George R R Martin.

2010

 Liu Cixin, Sishen Yongsheng [literally "Death Immortal"; Chinese cover has the English title "Dead End"] (2009);
 He Xi, Rensheng Bu Xiangxian ["No Sign of Life"] (2009);
 (Most Popular Foreign Writer) George R R Martin.

2011

 Wang Jinkang, Yuwu Tongzai ["We, Together"] (2011) (Grand Prize);
 Chen Qiufan, Wujin de Gaobie ["Infinite Goodbyes"] (November 2011 Kehuan Shijie);
 Yin Kemi, Leifeng Ta ["Thunder Peak Pagoda"] (December 2011 Kehuan Shijie);
 Liu Shuiqing, Dijiu Zhan de Shiren ["Poet of the Ninth Stage"] (September 2011 Kehuan Shijie);
 (Most Popular Foreign Writer) Paolo Bacigalupi.

2012

 Zhang Ran, Yitai ["Ether"](2012);
 He Xi, Wangyang Zhanzheng ["War on the Seeping Sea"] (February 2012 Kehuan Shijie);
 Bao Shu, Zai Mingwangxing shang Women Zuo Xialai Guankan ["On Pluto We Sit Down and Watch"] (venue unknown) (2012);
 (Most Popular Foreign Writer) David Brin.

2013

 Wang Jinkang, Taochu Mu Yuzhou ["Escape from the Mother Universe"](2013);
 Zhao Ran, Qifeng zhi Cheng ["The Windy City"] (2013 chap?);
 Jiang Bo, Mengxing Huanghun ["Awaking at Dusk"] (September 2013 Kehuan Shijie);
 (Most Popular Foreign Writer) Ken Liu.

2014

 No Long-Form Award;
 Zhao Ran, Daji zhi Nian ["The Years of Famine"] (venue unknown)(2014);
 Bao Shu, Renren Dou Ai Cha'ersi ["Everybody Loves Charles"] (September 2014 Kehuan Shijie);
 (Most Popular Foreign Writer) Ken Liu.

2016

 Best Novel
 Tian Nian (Natural Span of Life) by  He Xi
 Special Contribution Award
 Yang Xiao

2017

 Best Novel
 The Heart of Galaxy III: Chasing Shadow and Light, by Jiang Bo

2018

 Best Short Story
 Tian Tu (The Painting Of Sky) by Wang Jinkang
 Amorville by Bella Han
 An Account of the Sky Whales by A Que
 Best Novelette
 The Hearts Behind by Gu Di
 Forest of Death by Peng Chao
 Best Novel
 vacant

2019

Best Novel
 The Door of the Machine, Jiang Bo (Sichuan Science and Technology Publishing)
 Best Novella
 Brain Gambling, Gu Shi
 Best Short Story (tie)
 “The Growth Rings of the Earth”, Kong Xinwei
 “Chengdu Past”, Bao Shu
 “Song Xiuyun”, A Que
 Best Newcomer
 Yang Wanqing
 Best Translated Novel
 Dragon's Egg, Robert L. Forward, translated by Hu Shu
 Best Webnovel
 Dead on Mars, Tian Rui
 Best Related Book
 In Other Worlds: Science Fiction and the Human Imagination, Margaret Atwood (Henan University Press)
 Best Original Book
 The Defective (残次品), priest, Jiangsu Fenghuang Literature and Art Publishing House
 Strangers (异乡人), E Bojue(E伯爵), Sichuan Science & Technology Publishing House Company

References

Award ceremonies
Science fiction awards